The 193rd Tank Battalion was a battalion of the United States Army during World War II. It was briefly reformed in the Colorado Army National Guard postwar.

The unit's history is primarily that of the 193rd Tank Battalion which served in the Pacific theater during World War II with the 27th Infantry Division, throughout, and during the Korean war. The battalion provided amphibious assault vehicles during the Gilberts assault/Operation Galvanic for the Battle of Makin, the assault on Butaritari, known to the U.S. troops at the time as Makin Island.

Lineage
Constituted 1 September 1940 in the National Guard as the 193rd Tank Battalion and partially organized by redesignation of divisional light tank companies from various states as follows;
 30th Tank Company (Light), Georgia National Guard, as Company A
 31st Tank Company (Light), Alabama National Guard, as Company B
 36th Tank Company (Light), Texas National Guard, as Company C
 45th Tank Company (Light), Colorado National Guard, as Company D
Organization completed and battalion inducted into Federal service on 20 January 1941 at Fort Benning, Georgia (Headquarters Company organized at Fort Benning from personnel of companies which had been inducted 8 January 1941 at home stations
Battalion inactivated 21 January 1946 at Vancouver Barracks, Washington.
Battalion allotted, less lettered companies, to the Colorado National Guard 10 May 1946; concurrently the 983rd Field Artillery Battalion was consolidated with the 193rd Tank Battalion. The lineage of Company B was perpetuated by Alabama's 131st Tank Battalion, 
Battalion organized and Federally recognized 17 April 1947 with headquarters at Colorado Springs.
Battalion reorganized and redesignated 1 November 1949 as the 193rd Heavy Tank Battalion.
Battalion ordered into active federal service at Colorado Springs 3 September 1950.
Battalion released from active Federal service and reverted to state control 1 August 1952
Battalion redesignated 1 December 1952 as the 193rd Tank Battalion.
Battalion broken up 1 August 1955. Headquarters and Service Company converted and redesignated as Headquarters and Headquarters Battery, 169th Field Artillery Battalion; concurrently, remainder of battalion organized from existing units as follows
 Company A, 193rd Tank Battalion (Canon City) redesignated Battery A
 Service Company, 157th Infantry (Englewood) redesignated Battery B
 Company I, 157th Infantry (Burlington) redesignated Service Battery
 Medical Detachment, 193rd Tank Battalion (Colorado Springs) redesignated Medical Detachment.
Battalion broken up 1 February 1959 and elements converted, redesignated or consolidated as follows;
 Headquarters and Headquarters Battery, Battery C, and Medical Detachment at Colorado Springs consolidated and redesignated as Company D, 140th Signal Battalion.
 Battery A at Canon City redesignated as Service Battery, 2nd Howitzer Battalion, 157th Field Artillery
 Service Battery at Burlington redesignated as the 928th Medical Company.

Campaign streamers
World War I
Streamer without inscription
World War II
 Central Pacific
 New Guinea
 Leyte
 Luzon
 Southern Philippines
 Sicily (With Arrowhead)
 Naples Foggia (With Arrowhead)
 Anzio
 Rome-Arno
 Southern France (With Arrowhead)
 Rhineland
 Ardennes-Alsace
 Central Europe

Decorations
Philippine Presidential Unit Citation, streamer embroidered 17 October 1944 to 4 July 1945

Coat of arms
 Shield
Per fess indented azure and or, in chief a fleur-de-lis argent, in base a sheathed Roman sword, point to base and a snake coiled to strike vert
 Crest
The crest is that of the Colorado Army National Guard
 Background
The shield is blue and yellow in reference to early service of the 983rd Field Artillery Battalion as infantry and Cavalry. The fleur-de-lis indicates service in France during World War I while the Roman sword and snake refer to service during the war with Spain, and on the Mexican border respectively. The yellow base of the shield is representative of the plains of eastern Colorado and the indented division of the shield the mountainous portion of the state against the skyline.

References

Citations

Bibliography 
 
   lineage

External links
 http://www.history.army.mil/html/forcestruc/lineages/branches/av/default.htm 
 https://archive.today/20130221125732/http://myweb.cableone.net/garysly/

Tank battalions of the United States Army
Military units and formations established in 1940
Military units and formations disestablished in 1955
1940 establishments in the United States